Arthur Shirley Benn, 1st Baron Glenravel,  (20 December 1858 – 13 June 1937), known as Sir Arthur Benn, Bt, between 1926 and 1936, was a British businessman and politician.

Early life
He was born on 20 December 1858, in Cork, Ireland, the son of Reverend John Watkins Benn. He received his formal education at Clifton College, then at Inner Temple.

Business career
He became a managing director, then the British Vice-Consul to Mobile, Alabama.

Political career
Benn became active in the Conservative Party, and stood in Battersea at the 1906 general election.  In 1907, he was elected to London County Council, representing the equivalent seat, a post he held for four years. He stood for Parliament in Battersea again in January 1910. In December, he was instead elected at Plymouth.

In 1915 during the First World War he was a member of the House of Commons' 'Ammunition Committee', established by David Lloyd George as Minister of Munitions.

Benn moved to represent Plymouth Drake in 1918, and in the Birthday Honours that year was appointed to the Order of the British Empire as a Knight Commander (KBE). In 1921, he became the President of the Association of British Chambers of Commerce, a position he held until 1923, and also became the Chair of the National Unionist Association. In 1926 he was created a baronet, of Plymouth in the County of Devon. From 1927, he was the Director of the International Chamber of Commerce.

Benn lost his seat in 1929, and at the next general election in 1931 was elected for Sheffield Park, but then lost this seat in 1935. In 1936 he was raised to the peerage as Baron Glenravel, of Kensington in the County of London.

Death
He died on 13 June 1937 at the age of 78, without issue, when the baronetcy and barony became extinct. His body was buried at Hanwell Cemetery in Ealing, London.

Personal life
He married Alys Maria Luling, daughter of Florenz Augustus Luling of New Orleans and later of Mobile, Alabama, on 9 May 1888.

Arms

References

Michael Stenton and Stephen Lees, Who's Who of British MPs: Volume III, 1919-1945

External links 
 

Glenravel
Glenravel
Glenravel
Politics of Sheffield
Conservative Party (UK) MPs for English constituencies
Glenravel
Glenravel
UK MPs 1910–1918
UK MPs 1918–1922
UK MPs 1922–1923
UK MPs 1923–1924
UK MPs 1924–1929
UK MPs 1931–1935
UK MPs who were granted peerages
Members of London County Council
Glenravel
Members of the Parliament of the United Kingdom for Plymouth
Peers created by Edward VIII